The NLR Air Transport Safety Institute (NLR-ATSI) is a research and consultancy organisation embedded in the National Aerospace Laboratory of the Netherlands (NLR). NLR-ATSI is one of the largest institutes of its kind in Europe. The institute was officially opened by Prof. Pieter van Vollenhoven on October 31, 2007. NLR-ATSI is a not-for-profit organisation with 32 employees. Around the world, NLR helps all air transportation stakeholders understand and address the complex safety challenges of new technologies and operations required for air transportation development. NLP's clients include air navigation service providers, aviation authorities, airports and airlines.

The institute advises government and industry in the Netherlands and abroad on air transport safety issues. The services provided by NLR-ATSI can be divided into the following expert areas:
 Safety Management
 Safety regulation
 Safety cases and safety assessments
 Operational and flight technical assessments
 Air safety data analysis
 Safety modelling for advanced operations
 Incident & Accident investigation
 Safety training
 Security

The European Aviation Safety Agency (EASA) uses data from NLR-ATSI on the operation of aircraft for commercial air transport for their annual safety review.

References

External links
 NLR-ATSI Home page
 NLR Home Page
 Introduction NLR-ATSI
 ProGA (SESAR WP-E research project led by NLR-ATSI)
 ASCOS (European Commission research project led by NLR-ATSI)

Research institutes in the Netherlands
Aerospace companies of the Netherlands